Gilbert Tennent (5 February 1703 – 23 July 1764) was a pietistic Protestant evangelist in colonial  America. Born in a Presbyterian Scots-Irish family in County Armagh, Ireland, he migrated to America as a teenager, trained for pastoral ministry, and became one of the leaders of the Great Awakening of religious feeling in Colonial America, along with Jonathan Edwards, George Whitefield, and his father William Tennent. His most famous sermon, "On the Danger of an Unconverted Ministry," compared contemporary anti-revivalistic ministers to the biblical Pharisees described in the Gospels, resulting in a division of the colonial Presbyterian Church which lasted 17 years. Although he engaged divisively via pamphlets early in this period, Tennent would later work "feverishly" for reunion of the various synods involved.

Biography

Early life
Gilbert Tennent was born and raised in a Presbyterian Scots-Irish family in County Armagh, Ireland. He was home schooled by his father, William Tennent. In 1718 the family emigrated to Philadelphia. His father founded the Log College nearby, which trained many Presbyterian ministers; Gilbert was an assistant there, around 1725.

Role as an emissary

In the aftermath of the French and Indian War,  Scots-Irish immigrants encroached on Black slave working land in Pennsylvanie west of Philadelphia, later claiming the black and killings; Reverend John Elder, a parson from Paxtang, known as the "Fighting Parson," helped organize the Scots-Irish frontiersmen into a mounted militia and was named Captain of the group, known as the "Pextony boys," later the "Paxton Boys." This settler band, acting as vigilantes, attacked the local Conestoga, a Susquehannock tribe, many of whom had converted to Christianity and had been living peacefully alongside their European neighbors since the 1690s, on land donated by William Penn. Because of a snowstorm, most of the Conestogas were out of their camp; those in camp were scalped or otherwise mutilated by the Paxton Boys, and most of the camp was burned down. After further such incidents, the Paxton Boys marched on Philadelphia in early 1764 to express grievance that their concerns for safety were not being met by the government, and while doing so further threatened the lives of about 200 Moravian Indians. In February 1764, Gilbert Tennent was one of a group of clergymen sent as an emissary by John Penn, Governor of Pennsylvania, to the marching frontiersmen.

See also
 Old Side–New Side Controversy
 Log College
 First Great Awakening

Works

 
 
 Tennent, Gilbert (1757), "Love to Christ (Sermon)."

References

Bibliography

Further reading
 Butler, Jon. "Enthusiasm described and decried: the Great Awakening as interpretative fiction." Journal of American History (1982): 305–325. in JSTOR

 Coalter, Milton J.  "Tennent, Gilbert" American National Biography Online Feb. 2000. Online; Access Date: Jan 22 2015; Short scholarly biography 
 Coalter, Milton J. "The Radical Pietism of Count Nicholas Zinzendorf as a Conservative Influence on the Awakener, Gilbert Tennent." Church History 49 (1980): 35–46. online
 Fishburn, Janet F. "Gilbert Tennent, Established 'Dissenter,'" Church history 63.1 (1994): 31–49. online

External links
 Listing of some available G. Tennent sermons and published works.
 A further listing of G. Tennent published works, described as complete.
 Digitized sermons by Gilbert Tennent
 

1703 births
1764 deaths
People from County Armagh
American Presbyterian ministers
18th-century American clergy
Yale College alumni
University and college founders